Richard Stanley Kayne is Professor of Linguistics in the Linguistics Department at New York University.

After receiving an A.B. in mathematics from Columbia College, New York City in 1964, he studied linguistics at the Massachusetts Institute of Technology, receiving his Ph.D. in 1969. He then taught at the University of Paris VIII (1969–1986), MIT (1986–1988) and the City University of New York (1988–1997), becoming Professor at New York University in 1997.

He has made prominent contributions to the study of the syntax of English and the Romance languages within the framework of transformational grammar. His theory of Antisymmetry has become part of the canon of the Minimalist syntax literature.

References

External links
Homepage

Linguists from the United States
Generative linguistics
Syntacticians
Living people
Academic staff of Paris 8 University Vincennes-Saint-Denis
New York University faculty
Year of birth missing (living people)
Columbia College (New York) alumni
Fellows of the Linguistic Society of America